Gnathophis melanocoelus (known commonly as the Blackgut conger) is an eel in the family Congridae (conger/garden eels). It was described by Emma Stanislavovna Karmovskaya and John Richard Paxton in 2000. It is a subtropical, marine eel which is known from western Australia, in the eastern Indian Ocean. It is known to dwell at a depth of 156 metres.

References

melanocoelus
Taxa named by Emma Stanislavovna Karmovskaya
Taxa named by John Richard Paxton
Fish described in 2000